Swan Valley Anglican Community School is a co-educational, Kindergarten to Year 12, day school located in Perth, Western Australia. The school, located in Perth's north-eastern suburb of Aveley, in the Swan Valley, was opened in 2006.

The school has more than 1100 students.

In 2007, the ABC program Gardening Australia reported on the school's context in the Swan Valley:

The Swan Valley, north east of Perth, is a productive area with orchards and vineyards. But as the suburbs expand, houses, shops and schools are also part of the landscape. The Swan Valley Anglican Community School has plans to make its own grounds productive once again.

Swan Valley Anglican Community School is a school of the Anglican Schools Commission. The Anglican Schools Commission was founded to establish and support low fee paying Anglican systemic schools which provide a high quality, inclusive, caring Christian education. The school publication is known as The Vine.

References

External links
 

Anglican primary schools in Perth, Western Australia
Anglican Schools Commission
Anglican secondary schools in Perth, Western Australia
Educational institutions established in 2006
2006 establishments in Australia